Avatar is a concept within Hinduism that in Sanskrit literally means "descent". It signifies the material appearance or incarnation of a powerful deity, goddess or spirit on Earth. The relative verb to "alight, to make one's appearance" is sometimes used to refer to any guru or revered human being.

The word avatar does not appear in the Vedic literature; however, it appears in developed forms in post-Vedic literature, and as a noun particularly in the Puranic literature after the 6th century CE. Despite that, the concept of an avatar is compatible with the content of the Vedic literature like the Upanishads as it is symbolic imagery of the Saguna Brahman concept in the philosophy of Hinduism. The Rigveda describes Indra as endowed with a mysterious power of assuming any form at will. The Bhagavad Gita expounds the doctrine of Avatara but with terms other than avatar.

Theologically, the term is most often associated with the Hindu god Vishnu, though the idea has been applied to other deities. Varying lists of avatars of Vishnu appear in Hindu scriptures, including the ten Dashavatara of the Garuda Purana and the twenty-two avatars in the Bhagavata Purana, though the latter adds that the incarnations of Vishnu are innumerable. The avatars of Vishnu are important in Vaishnavism theology. In the goddess-based Shaktism tradition of Hinduism, avatars of the Devi in different appearances such as Tripura Sundari, Durga and Kali are commonly found. While avatars of other deities such as Ganesha and Shiva are also mentioned in medieval Hindu texts, this is minor and occasional. The incarnation doctrine is one of the important differences between Vaishnavism and Shaivism traditions of Hinduism.

Incarnation concepts that are in some aspects similar to avatar are also found in Buddhism, Christianity, and other religions.

The scriptures of Sikhism include the names of numerous Hindu gods and goddesses, but it rejected the doctrine of savior incarnation and endorsed the view of Hindu Bhakti movement saints such as Namdev, that formless eternal god is within the human heart, and man is his own savior.

Etymology and meaning
The Sanskrit noun is derived from the Sanskrit prefix ava- (down) and the root  (to cross over). These roots trace back, states Monier-Williams, to -taritum, -tarati, -rītum. It's cognate to "away" in English, which is root from PIE *au- means "off, away".

Avatar means "descent, alight, to make one's appearance", and refers to the embodiment of the essence of a superhuman being or a deity in another form. The word also implies "to overcome, to remove, to bring down, to cross something". In Hindu traditions, the "crossing or coming down" is symbolism, states Daniel Bassuk, of the divine descent from "eternity into the temporal realm, from unconditioned to the conditioned, from infinitude to finitude". An avatar, states Justin Edwards Abbott, is a saguna (with form, attributes) embodiment of the nirguna Brahman or Atman (soul). Avatar, according to 
Bhaktisiddhanta Sarasvati actually means 'Divine Descent' in his commentaries of The Shrimad Bhagavatam and The Bramha Samhita (mentioned in Brahmavaivarta Purana).

Neither the Vedas nor the Principal Upanishads ever mention the word avatar as a noun. The related verb  is, states Paul Hacker, used with double meaning, one as action of the divine descending, another as "laying down the burden of man" suffering from the forces of evil.

The term is most commonly found in the context of the Hindu god Vishnu. The earliest mention of Vishnu manifested in a human form to establish Dharma on Earth, uses other terms such as the word sambhavāmi in verse 4.6 and the word tanu in verse 9.11 of the Bhagavad Gita, as well as other words such as akriti and rupa elsewhere. It is in medieval era texts, those composed after the sixth century CE, that the noun version of avatar appears, where it means embodiment of a deity. The idea proliferates thereafter, in the Puranic stories for many deities, and with ideas such as ansha-avatar or partial embodiments.

The term avatar, in colloquial use, is also an epithet or a word of reverence for any extraordinary human being who is revered for his or her ideas. In some contexts, the term avatara just means a "landing place, site of sacred pilgrimage", or just "achieve one's goals after effort", or retranslation of a text in another language. The term avatar is not unique to Hinduism even though the term originated with Hinduism. It is found in the Trikaya doctrine of Mahayana Buddhism, in descriptions for the Dalai Lama in Tibetan Buddhism, and many ancient cultures.

Avatar versus incarnation
The manifest embodiment is sometimes referred to as an incarnation. The translation of avatar as "incarnation" has been questioned by Christian theologians, who state that an incarnation is in flesh and imperfect, while avatar is mythical and perfect. The theological concept of Christ as an incarnation, as found in Christology, presents the Christian concept of incarnation. The term avatar in Hinduism refers to act of various gods taking form to perform a particular task which in most of the times is bringing dharma back. The concept of avatar is widely accepted all over the India. Sheth disagrees and states that this claim is an incorrect understanding of the Hindu concept of avatar. Avatars are embodiments of spiritual perfection, driven by noble goals, in Hindu traditions such as Vaishnavism. The concept of the avatar in Hinduism is not incompatible with natural conception through a sexual act, which is again different from the Christian concept of the Virgin Birth.

Avatars of Vishnu 

The concept of avatar within Hinduism is most often associated with Vishnu, the preserver or sustainer aspect of God within the Hindu Trinity or Trimurti of Brahma, Vishnu and Shiva. Vishnu's avatars descend to empower the good and fight evil, thereby restoring Dharma. Traditional Hindus see themselves not as "Hindu", but as Vaishnava (Worshippers of Vishnu), Shaiva (Worshippers of Shiva), or Shakta (Worshipper of the Shakti). Each of the deities has its own iconography and mythology, but common to all is the fact that the divine reality has an explicit form, a form that the worshipper can behold. An oft-quoted passage from the Bhagavad Gita describes the typical role of an avatar of Vishnu:

The Vishnu avatars appear in Hindu mythology whenever the cosmos is in crisis, typically because evil has grown stronger and has thrown the cosmos out of its balance. The avatar then appears in a material form, to destroy evil and its sources, and restore the cosmic balance between the ever-present forces of good and evil.

The most known and celebrated avatars of Vishnu, within the Vaishnavism traditions of Hinduism, are Krishna, Rama, Narayana and Vasudeva. These names have extensive literature associated with them, each has its own characteristics, legends and associated arts. The Mahabharata, for example, includes Krishna, while the Ramayana includes Rama.

Dashavatara

The Bhagavata Purana describes Vishnu's avatars as innumerable, though ten of his incarnations, the Dashavatara, are celebrated therein as his major appearances.  The ten major Vishnu avatars are mentioned in the Agni Purana, the Garuda Purana and the Bhagavata Purana.

The ten best known avatars of Vishnu are collectively known as the Dashavatara (a Sanskrit compound meaning "ten avatars"). Five different lists are included in the Bhagavata Purana, where the difference is in the sequence of the names. Freda Matchett states that this re-sequencing by the composers may be intentional, so as to avoid implying priority or placing something definitive and limited to the abstract.

Longer alternatives
The Bhagavata Purana also goes on to give an alternate list, wherein it numerically lists out 23 Vishnu avatars in chapter 1.3.

 Four Kumaras (Catursana): the four Sons of god Brahma and exemplifying the path of devotion
 Varaha: The divine boar who lifts earth from cosmic waters
 Narada: the divine-sage who travels the worlds as a devotee of Vishnu
 Nara-Narayana: the twin-sages
 Kapila: a renowned sage spoken of in the Mahabharata, son of Kardama Muni and Devahuti and sometimes identified with the founder of the Samkhya school of philosophy
 Dattatreya: the combined avatar of the Hindu trinity Brahma, Vishnu and Shiva. He was born to the sage Atri became a great seer himself
 Yajna: the lord of sacrifices
 Rishabha: the father of Bharata Chakravartin and Bahubali
 Prithu: the sovereign-king who milked the earth as a cow to get the world's grain and vegetation and also invented agriculture
 Matsya: A narwhal who guided Manu's ark during the pralaya (deluge) and also killed demon Hayagriva
 Kurma: A giant tortoise who balances Mount Mandara atop his carapace during the churning of cosmic ocean of milk 
 Dhanvantari: the father of Ayurvedic medicine and a physician to the Devas
 Mohini: the enchantress
 Narasimha: The man-lion who kills demon Hiranyakashpu
 Vamana: The dwarf-brahmana who takes the three worlds from Bali Maharaj and purifies Him
 Parashurama: The Brahmin warrior with an axe who kills Kartyavira Arjuna and his Kshatriya allies
 Rama: 'Perfect King' from Suryavansha, Subject of Ramayana
 Vyasa: the compiler of the scriptures – Vedas and writer of the scriptures (Puranas) and the epic Mahabharata
  Krishna: Subject of the Mahabharata and the Bhagavad Gita
Gautama Buddha: Founder Of Buddhism .
 Kalki: The Divine Warrior 

Avatars like Hayagriva, Hamsa and Garuda are also mentioned in the Pancharatra making a total of forty-six avatars. However, despite these lists, the commonly accepted number of ten avatars for Vishnu was fixed well before the 10th century CE. Madhvacharya also regards Gautama Buddha as an avatar of Vishnu.

Manava Purana

Manava Purana is one of Upa puranas. It narrates 42 avatars of Vishnu.

 Adipurusha 
 Four Kumaras (Chatursanas)
 Narada 
 Dattatreya 
 Kapila 
 Nara- Narayana 
 Yajna 
 Vibhu
 Satyasena 
 Hari
 Vaikunta 
 Ajita 
 Sharvabhouma 
 Vrishbha 
 Visvaksena
 Dharmasetu 
 Sudhama
 Yogeshwara
 Brihadbhanu 
 Shaligram 
 Hayagriva 
 Hamsa 
 Vyasa 
 Matsya 
 Kurma 
 Dhanvantri 
 Mohini
 Prithu 
 Vrishbha deva
 Varaha 
 Narasimha 
 Vamana 
 Parashurama 
 Rama 
 Krishna
 Buddha 
 Vikhanasa
 Venkateswara
 Chaitanya Mahaprabhu 
 Dhyaneshwar 
 Kalki

Types

The avatar concept was further developed and refined in later Hindu texts. One approach was to identify full avatars and partial avatars. Krishna, Rama, and Narasimha were full avatars (purna avatars), while others were partial avatars (ansha avatars). Some declared, states Noel Sheth, that every living creature is an avatar of Vishnu. The Pancharatra text of Vaishnavism declares that Vishnu's avatars include those that are direct and complete, indirect and endowed, cosmic and salvific, inner and inspirational, consecrated and in the form of image.

Yet another classification, developed in Krishna schools, centers around Guna-avatars, Purusha-avatars and Lila-avatars, with their subtypes. The Guna-avatar classification of avatars is based on the Guṇas concept of the Samkhya school of Hindu philosophy, that is Rajas (Brahma), Sattva (Vishnu), and Tamas (Shiva). These personalities of the Trimurti are referred to as Guna avatars. The Purushavatara are three. The first evolves all matter (Prakriti), the second is the soul present in each individual creature, the third is the interconnected oneness or Brahman that connects all souls. The Lilavataras are partial or full manifestations of Vishnu, where either some powers (Shakti) or material parts of him exist.

Vishnu is Purushavatara. The Matsya, Kurma, and Vamana avatars of Vishnu are Lilavataras. A Purnarupa in this classification, is when Vishnu manifests completely along with his qualities and powers. In Bengal Vaishnavism, Krishna is the Purnarupa. In Shaivism, Bhairava is the purnarupa of Shiva.

In Sikhism
24 avatars of Vishnu are mentioned in Bachitar Natak's composition in Dasam Granth, the second scripture of Sikhism written by Guru Gobind Singh:

The Guru Granth Sahib reverentially includes the names of numerous Hindu deities, including Vishnu avatars such as Krishna, Hari, and Rama, as well those of Devi as Durga.

Dasam Granth has three major compositions, one each dedicated to avatars of Vishnu (Chaubis avatar) and Brahma. However, Sikhism rejects the doctrine of savior incarnation, and only accepts the abstract nirguna formless god. The Sikh Gurus endorsed the view of Hindu Bhakti movement saints such as Namdev (≈1270 – 1350 CE) that formless eternal god is within the human heart and man is his own savior.

In Isma'ilism

The Gupti Ismailis, who observe pious circumspection as Hindus, uphold that the first Shi‘i Imam, ‘Ali b. Abi Talib, as well as his descendants though the line of Isma‘il, are collectively Kalki, the tenth and final avatāra of Vishnu. According to this interpretation, these figures represent the continuity of divine guidance to humankind. In the view of some Guptis, this is corroborated by the Quranic verse 14:4 which mentions the idea that God had sent a messenger to every land. They understand the avatāras to be these messengers sent by God to their people in the Indian subcontinent.

Avatars of Shiva

Although Puranic scriptures contain occasional references to avatars of Shiva, the avatar doctrine is neither universally accepted nor commonly adopted in Shaivism. The views on the doctrine of incarnation has been one of the significant doctrinal differences between Vaishnavism and Shaivism, in addition to their differences on the role of householder life versus monastic life for spiritual release. Shaivism is a transcendental theology, where man, with the help of his Guru, is his own savior.

The Linga Purana lists twenty-eight avatars of Shiva. In the Shiva Purana there is a distinctly Saivite version of a traditional avatar myth: Shiva brings forth Virabhadra, one of his terrifying forms, in order to calm Narasimha, an avatar of Vishnu. When that fails, Shiva manifests as the human-lion-bird Sharabha which calms down lion-man Narasimha avatar of Vishnu, and Shiva then gives Vishnu a chakra (not to be confused with Sudarshan Chakra) as gift. A similar story is told in the late medieval era Sharabha Upanishad. However, Vaishnava Dvaita school refutes this Shaivite view of Narasimha. According to the Shiva Purana, Lord Shiva has 19 avatars. According to the Kurma Purana, he has 28.

The vanara god Hanuman who helped Rama (the Vishnu avatar) is considered by some to be the eleventh avatar of Rudra (Shiva). Some regional deities like Khandoba are also believed by some to be avatars of Shiva.
Ashwatthama, the son of Drona is also considered to be an Avatar of Lord Shiva.

Shesha and his avatars (Balarama and Lakshmana) are occasionally linked to Shiva. Adi Shankara, the formulator of Advaita Vedanta, is also occasionally regarded as an avatar of Shiva.

In Dasam Granth, Guru Gobind Singh mentioned two avatars of Rudra: Dattatreya Avatar and Parasnath Avatar.

Avatars of Devis 

Avatars are also observed in Shaktism, the sect dedicated to the worship of the Goddess (Devi), but they do not have universal acceptance in the sect. The Devi Bhagavata Purana describes the descent of Devi avatars to punish the wicked and defend the righteous as – much as the Bhagavata Purana does with the avatars of Vishnu.

Nilakantha, an 18th-century commentator on the Devi Bhagavata Purana – which includes the Devi Gita – says that various avatars of the Goddess includes Shakambhari and even the masculine Krishna and Rama – generally thought to be Vishnu's avatars. Parvati, Lakshmi and Saraswati are main goddesses worshipped as Devi avatars.

Avatars of Parvati
Devi is popular in her form as Parvati. In Devi Mahatmya she is seen as the Goddess Mahakali, and in Uma Samhita, she is seen as Devi herself. Regarding her incarnations, it varies per sect in Hinduism. She could be all Goddesses as said in Shaivism and some main Shatism interpretations like the Sri kula and Kali Kula families, or just a form of Devi in some other Shaktism interpretations and many Vaishnava interpretations. With this in mind, Parvati's forms include:
 Mahakali
 Sati
 Mahavidyas- Kali, Tara, Tripurasundari, Bhuvaneshwari, Bhairavi, Chinnamasta, Dhumavati, Bagalamukhi
 The 64 Shakti Peethas 
 Navadurgas - Shailaputri, Brahmacharini, Chandraghanta, Kushmanda, Skandamata, Katyayani, Kaalratri, Mahagauri, Siddhidhatri 
 Annapurna
 Kaushiki
 Durga
Shitala
 Maheshwari 
 Jayadurga
 Ardhanarishvara 
 Vindhyavasini 
 Bhramari 
 Shakambhari 
 Raktadantika 
 Bhimadevi
 Twarita
 Ugrachanda
In north India- Khodiyar, Bahuchara Mata, Naina Devi, Jwala etc.
 In western India- Bhavani, Saptashrungi, Ekvira, Amba etc.
 In East India-Dakshina Kali, Kamakhya, Jagadhatri etc.
 In South India- Meenakshi, Vishalakshi, Kamakshi, Abhirami, Mookambika, Akilandeswari, etc.

All of these incarnations helped provide security to the world and even brought Shiva into the participation of worldly affairs.

Avatars of Lakshmi
Like Vishnu, his consort Lakshmi incarnates as in many forms to help provide order and to enlighten the world with her consort. She has many forms, and just like Parvati, some of her forms are not consistent throughout all sects and interpretations of Hinduism. In Vaishnavism and some interpretations of Shaktism, Lakshmi is seen as Devi herself. She could be every Goddess as said in Vaishnavism and some interpretations of Shaktism, or just another form of Devi as seen in other interpretations of Shaktism and in Shaivism. With this in mind, Lakshmi's forms include:
 Mahalakshmi
 At 108 Divya Desam
 Ashtalakshmi - Adi Lakshmi, Dhanya Lakshmi, Dhana Lakshmi, Gaja Lakshmi, Santana Lakshmi, Vidya Lakshmi, Veera Lakshmi, Vijaya Lakshmi
 With avatars of Vishnu - Sita, Radha, Gopi, Rukmini, Ashtabharya,  Junior wives of Krishna, Yashodhara (for those who believe Buddha is an incarnation of Vishnu), Padmavathi, Lakshmi Narayana, Andal, Dharini, Vishnupriya
 Singular forms - Vedavati, Chottanikkara Bhagavathy, Mookambika devi, Vaishno Devi, As Kolhapur ambabai
 Matrikas - Vaishnavi, Varahi, Narasimhi
 Wives of Vishnu - Sri, Bhumi, Nila
 Mahavidya Kamalatmika

Avatars of Brahma
In Dasam Granth, second scriptures of Sikhs written by Guru Gobind Singh, mentioned seven Brahma Avatars.
Valmiki
Kashyapa
Shukra
Baches
Vyasa
Khat
Kalidasa
According to the Skanda Purana, Brahma incarnated himself as Yajnavalkya in response to a curse from Shiva.

Avatars of Ganesha
The Linga Purana declares that Ganesha incarnates to destroy demons and to help the gods and pious people. The two Upapuranas – Ganesha Purana and Mudgala Purana – detail the avatars of Ganesha. Both these upapuranas are core scriptures of the Ganapatya sect – exclusively dedicated to Ganesha worship.

Four avatars of Ganesha are listed in the Ganesha Purana: Mohotkata, Mayūreśvara, Gajanana and Dhumraketu. Each avatar corresponds to a different yuga, has a different mount and different skin complexion, but all the avatars have a common purpose – to slay demons.

The Mudgala Puranam describes eight avatars of Ganesha:
Vakratunda ("twisting trunk"), his mount is a lion.
Ekadanta ("single tusk"), his mount is a mouse.
Mahodara ("big belly"), his mount is a mouse.
Gajavaktra (or Gajānana) ("elephant face"), his mount is a mouse.
Lambodara ("pendulous belly"), his mount is a mouse.
Vikata ("unusual form", "misshapen"), his mount is a peacock.
Vighnaraja ("king of obstacles"), his mount is the celestial serpent .
Dhumravarna ("grey color") corresponds to Śiva, his mount is a horse.

Avatars of Varuna

Jhulelal, the Iṣṭa-devatā (most-revered deity) of Sindhi Hindus, is considered the incarnation of Varuna.

See also

 Abatur
 Avatars in the Mahabharata
 Dashavatara
 Gautama Buddha in Hinduism
 Incarnation
 List of avatar claimants
 Hindu eschatology

Explanatory notes

References

Citations

General bibliography

External links

 Avatars (Incarnations or Descents) of Vishnu
 Meher Baba's interpretation of the Avatar's origin

Hindu philosophical concepts
Vaishnavism